Ptyssoptera teleochra is a moth of the family Palaephatidae. It is found in New South Wales, Australia.

References

Moths described in 1893
Palaephatidae